Hana Storchová (born September 14, 1936) is a Czech painter and printmaker.

A native of Prague, Storchová began studying drawing while in secondary school. She graduated from that city's Academy of Fine Arts, at which she had studied drawing, in 1960. In addition to painting and printmaking, she has been active as an illustrator. Four of her works, three prints and an illustrated book, are in the collection of the National Gallery of Art.

References

1936 births
Living people
Czech women painters
Czech printmakers
Women printmakers
20th-century Czech painters
20th-century Czech printmakers
20th-century Czech women artists
21st-century painters
21st-century printmakers
21st-century Czech women artists
Artists from Prague
Academy of Fine Arts, Prague alumni